"The Heart Part 5" is a song by American rapper Kendrick Lamar. It was surprise released on May 8, 2022, through pgLang, Top Dawg Entertainment, Aftermath Entertainment and Interscope Records, as a promotional single to help anticipate the release for Lamar's fifth studio album Mr. Morale & the Big Steppers, where it was later included as a streaming bonus track. It is the fifth part in his "The Heart" song series following "The Heart Part 4" in 2017, and his first solo release in over four years. The song received five nominations at the 65th Annual Grammy Awards, including for Record of the Year, Song of the Year, Best Music Video, Best Rap Performance and Best Rap Song, eventually winning the latter two.

Background 
On August 20, 2021, Kendrick Lamar revealed through a blog post on his website that he was in the process of producing his upcoming fifth studio album; his final project under Top Dawg. He shared the album's name and release date through a pgLang-headed letter on April 18, 2022. Following the announcement, his website was updated with a new page entitled "The Heart", which contained 399 empty computer folders. News of the song's release was accidentally leaked by music streaming service Spotify, who teased the song through a description of Lamar's playlists before being changed.

Lyrics and composition 
"The Heart Part 5" is a conscious hip hop record driven by soul and jazz influences. Lamar wrote the song alongside its producers Johnny Kosich, Matt Schaeffer and Jake Kosich (known collectively as Beach Noise). Leon Ware and Arthur "T-Boy" Ross received posthumous songwriting credits for the interpolation of the 1976 single "I Want You", as performed by Marvin Gaye.

Lyrically, "The Heart Part 5" follows in the footsteps of its previous parts, and Lamar's third studio album To Pimp a Butterfly (2015), by offering social commentary on the climate of African-American culture and institutionalized discrimination. The song also delves into personal themes of empathy, death, and depression from different perspectives.

Music video 

The music video for "The Heart Part 5", directed by Lamar and Dave Free, was released alongside the song on May 8, 2022. In the video, Lamar performs the song against a red wall, while using deepfake technology to transform himself into six modern Black American figures: in order, they are former football player and convicted felon O. J. Simpson, rapper Kanye West, actors Jussie Smollett and Will Smith, former basketball player Kobe Bryant, and rapper Nipsey Hussle. The deepfakes were made by South Park creators Trey Parker and Matt Stone's studio Deep Voodoo.

Each of the six deepfakes perform a verse from the song that reflects on their own perspectives. Simpson's verse, which addresses itself as being done "for the culture", mentions a "bulletproof rover" as a reference to his 1994 Ford Bronco chase. West's verse reflects on his battle with bipolar disorder and how often he has been taken advantage of. Smollett's verse reflects on the hypocrisy surrounding the media coverage of his 2019 hate crime hoax and subsequent arrest. Smith's verse reflects on the backlash he received following his slapping incident of Chris Rock at the 94th Academy Awards. After a moment of silence from Lamar, Bryant's verse reflects on being an influential figure through hard work and dedication. Hussle's verse, the longest in the video, takes the form of a soliloquy in the aftermath of his 2019 murder, saying that he forgives his killer but that his "soul's in question".

Critical reception 
"The Heart Part 5" was met with widespread critical acclaim, with Lamar's tribute to Hussle, a lifelong friend, receiving universal praise amongst critics and his peers. Hussle's longtime partner, actress Lauren London, described the music video as "powerful art." Pitchfork crowned the song with its "Best New Track" honor, with Dylan Green writing, "The convincingness of the deepfakes is mixed, to say the least, but they amplify Lamar's words and serve to visualize a complicated lineage through Blackness and the pressures of celebrity. [...] Perspective constantly changes the playing field of life and Lamar is preparing us for what feels like his biggest shift yet." 

In a five-star review, Ben Beaumont-Thomas of The Guardian called the song "a heartstopping call for uplifted humanity", adding that Lamar's "flow is as charged and acute as ever as he lays out a manifesto of radical empathy." Highlighting Lamar's "own love for his community", Beaumont-Thomas praised how he "divines" Marvin Gaye's "innate social conscience, changing the title line from one of lust to one of hope, using the urgent disco rhythm to perfectly impart the seriousness of his feeling." Kyann-Sian Williams of NME writes that "In the final version of his form (he's said this will be his last album on the Top Dawg Entertainment label), Lamar – or Oklama – is taking ownership of his elder role in the rap world. He sees his influence and now wants to be a voice of reason and morality, not just a coveted rap star."

Awards and nominations

Personnel 
Adapted from Jaxtsa.

Musicians

 Kendrick Lamar – vocals
 Bekon – violin
 Johnny Kosich (Beach Noise) – percussion
 Kyle Miller (Aeris Roves) – violin, cello
 Matt Schaeffer (Beach Noise) – guitar, mellotron, Rhodes, bass, drums

Technical

 James Hunt – recording engineer
 Johnathan Turner – recording engineer
 Johnny Kosich (Beach Noise) – recording engineer, mixer
 Matt Schaeffer (Beach Noise) – recording engineer, mixer
 Ray Charles Brown – recording engineer
 Rob Bisel – recording engineer

 Kaushlesh "Garry" Purohit – assistant recording engineer
 Marco Echeverria – assistant recording engineer
 Sedrick Moore II – assistant recording engineer
 Thomas Warren – assistant recording engineer
 Michelle Mancini – mastering

Charts

References 

2022 songs
Kendrick Lamar songs
Songs written by Kendrick Lamar
Songs written by Leon Ware
Songs written by Arthur "T-Boy" Ross
Top Dawg Entertainment singles
Aftermath Entertainment singles
Interscope Records singles
Sequel songs
Deepfakes
American soul songs
Jazz rap songs
Grammy Award for Best Rap Performance